Trails of Treachery is a 1928 American silent Western film directed by Robert J. Horner and starring Fred Church and Ione Reed.

Cast
 Fred Church
 Ione Reed
 Margaret Earl
 Elizabeth Shafer 
 Kelly Gafford

References

Bibliography
 Langman, Larry. A Guide to Silent Westerns. Greenwood Publishing Group, 1992.

External links
 

1928 films
1928 Western (genre) films
American black-and-white films
Films directed by Robert J. Horner
Silent American Western (genre) films
1920s English-language films
1920s American films